Grand Lake is a freshwater lake located in Cameron Parish, Louisiana. The lake is not located in the community of Grand Lake, Louisiana.

Location
According to the United States Army Corps of Engineers, Grand Lake is located in the extreme south-central part of the state about 12 miles south of the town of Lake Arthur, Louisiana.  It is a large circular lake approximately 42,100 acres in size and is about 8.25 miles by 8.25 miles.

Mermentau River 
The Mermentau River flows through its western extremities therefore it is difficult to say whether the lake is an enlargement of the river or not.  The lake is isolated from roads and highways and has no direct accesses.  It has to be accessed from the Intracoastal Waterway that goes across its northern extremity, from points around the town of Lake Arthur to the north or from the town of Grand Chenier to the south. The Gulf of Mexico is easily accessed from this lake.

References

External links

Grand Lake
Bodies of water of Cameron Parish, Louisiana